Hassan Nawaz may refer to:
 Hassan Nawaz Sharif, son of the former prime minister of Pakistan Nawaz Sharif
 Hassan Nawaz (cricketer), Pakistani cricketer